Depressaria pyrenaella is a moth in the family Depressariidae. It was described by Jan Šumpich in 2013. It is found in the Pyrenees of Spain and France (Region of Languedoc-Roussillon).

References

Moths described in 2013
Depressaria
Moths of Europe